Nikolai Petrovich Avtonomov (April 18, 1894, Sergiyevskaya, Don Host Oblast - August 13, 1979, St. Petersburg, Florida, U.S.) was a former Orthodox clergymen and after, an Eastern Catholic clergyman in exile.

Origin

Avtonomov was born on April 6, 1894, in the family of Peter  Viktorovich Avtonomov, a priest of Sergiyevskaya, and Anastasia Avtonomov.

Early life and priest career

He studied at Tambov seminary where he was expelled in 1909 from the Class 4 for drunkenness. Since 1909 was a psalmist in Lebedyan. Since 1918, he served there in the rank of priest. In 1920, was a priest in Tsaritsyn (Stalingrad) Russian Orthodox diocese. In 1922 and 1923 declined in renovationist split.

Bishop of the Russian Orthodox Church

On May 18, 1930, being married, Avtonomov was consecrated as bishop of Stavropol and in December 1932 was a renovationist Bishop of Tver. In June 1933, Avtonomov was dismissed for staff. On July 21, 1933 he was dismissed from the Tver diocese for a number of wrong actions that degrade the dignity of bishop. On February 7, 1934 prohibited from serving for tactless activity as rector of the Cathedral of the city of Makhachkala, and then tried to get in Makhachkala autocephaly. On 11 April 1934 he was allowed to priesthood. On August 16, 1934 seconded to the Kursk metropolis] and on September 13, 1934 approved the ruling bishop of Old Oskol diocese. On December 29, 1934 dismissed from the Old-Oskol diocese for staff, with the right to be a dean. On January 30, 1935 seconded to the Metropolitan Ivanovo for superior's place. From December 1935 - on priestly jobs in Ivanovo. On December 5, 1936 was elevated to the rank of archbishop with the appointment of Archbishop Alexander.
omova arrested Alexander Boyarsky.

In Ukraine

In December 1942, he was evacuated to the Ukraine, where he managed to deceive the victim shortly Exarch Ukrainian Autonomous Church Metropolitan Alexy (Gromadskaya), which is January 3, 1943 appointed him temporary administrator of the diocese. There were a decision of the three bishops of the Ukrainian Autonomous Church on June 5, 1943 followed by a ban on who calls himself Archbishop Nicholas Avtonomova from serving.

In Poland

On January 29, 1944 with his wife, daughter and granddaughter arrived in Warsaw and at the request of the local German administration, several months ministered various support non-German parts formed from the East.

Relations with ROCOR

May 26, 1944, calling themselves "Orthodox leader for legionnaires and Wehrmacht military units and garrisons in the General Government," for the first time addressed the Synod of Bishops of the ROCOR with a petition to adopt it in canonical communion. Response from the Synod was not followed, but one of its members, the Metropolitan of Berlin and Germany Seraphim (Lade), June 21, wrote to the Archbishop that comes with it and its accompanying Cossacks in communion.

In Germany

After a month with little Avtonomov arrived in Berlin, and at a meeting with Peter Krasnov was able to make a favorable impression on the general. August 8 Head "church essay" Reich Security Main Office (RSHA) Neuhaus agreed to the appointment of Bishop Nicholas of the Main Department of Cossack troops. On August 16, 1945 Avtonomov wrote another petition to the Synod of Bishops, and on August 26, 1945 personally Metropolitan Anastasia (Gribanovsky). The Synod has conducted an investigation and found Avtonomov's imposture. In addition, the Metropolitan Anastasia did act Autonomous Council of Bishops of the Ukrainian Church in Warsaw on April 8, 1944, which confirmed the decision of the three bishops of the Church of June 5, 1943, and the report of the Chairman of the Commission on Ecclesiastical Affairs in the Russian Committee in the General Government A. K. Svitich results of the investigation committee on the matter. On April 9, 1945 Synod of Bishops finally rejected his request for reconsideration.

Conversion to Catholicism

After a few months of autonomy was adopted in Rome in the bosom of the Catholic Church being named Titular bishop of Ratiaria on October 6, 1945, he could preserved the Eastern rite, and then erected by Pope Pius XII to the rank of Metropolitan with a right cross and precarrying awarded a pectoral cross. As Archbishop and Uniate Metropolitan gained autonomy in December 1945, came to Munich, where he began to publish the magazine "The Bell" and gave it to Uniate Church. However, a year and a half was exposed as an impostor, removed and sent to a Catholic monastery.

Arrest by U.S. forces

On December 15, 1947 the U.S. occupation administration arrested on charges of spying for the Soviet Union. On March 10, 1948 Avtonomov was  released on bail and the charges for lack of evidence justified the 8th Judicial District Court of the United States military.

Release

After his release, was appointed to the Vatican to work with Russian emigrants in South America. There Avtonomov broke with the Catholics and emigrated to the United States. In the 1950s, several times unsuccessfully tried to cross into the American metropolis and in 1962 filed a petition to adopt him in the Greek Exarchate.
In the late 1960s he lived in New Haven, Connecticut. According to some sources he served in Byzantine Catholic Archeparchy of Pittsburgh,  in the United States and other cities in Connecticut as a parish priest. Then he lived in retirement.

Death

Avtonomov died on August 13, 1979 in St. Petersburg, Florida, United States. He was buried in the same place at the episcopal rank.

References

External links
 https://web.archive.org/web/20130617002322/http://www.ortho-rus.ru/cgi-bin/ps_file.cgi?2_281
 http://zarubezhje.narod.ru/av/a_162.htm
 http://old.kurskcity.ru/book/razdorsky/r017.html
 http://www.whiterussia1.narod.ru/CITIZII/PERSON.htm
 http://www.portal-credo.ru/site/?act=news&id=73002&cf=

1894 births
1979 deaths
People from Volgograd Oblast
People from Don Host Oblast
Former Russian Orthodox Christians
Converts to Eastern Catholicism from Eastern Orthodoxy
Russian Eastern Catholics
Soviet emigrants to the United States
Soviet bishops